Robert A. Dupuis (born August 26, 1952) is a Canadian former professional ice hockey goaltender who played one game in the National Hockey League (NHL) for the Edmonton Oilers during the 1979–80 season. The Oilers lost 5-3 to the Philadelphia Flyers on March 9, 1980, with Dupuis conceding four of those goals. Dupuis was one of six goalies used by the Oilers during the season.

Dupuis represented Canada at the 1980 Winter Olympics held in Lake Placid, where he was the goalie in three games; a win versus the Netherlands, and two losses in decisive games against Finland and Czechoslovakia.

Prior to 1980, he had played for five years in the senior Ontario Hockey Association with the Cambridge Hornets and Barrie Flyers, and had previous experience in junior B (North Bay Trappers) and semi-pro minor leagues.

Dupuis retired from hockey in 1981, moved to North Bay, Ontario and worked for the police department as a 9-1-1 dispatcher.

Career statistics

Regular season and playoffs

International

See also
 List of players who played only one game in the NHL

References

External links
 

1952 births
Living people
Canadian ice hockey goaltenders
Edmonton Oilers players
Hampton Aces players
Houston Apollos players
Ice hockey people from Ontario
Ice hockey players at the 1980 Winter Olympics
Milwaukee Admirals (IHL) players
Macon Whoopees (SHL) players
Olympic ice hockey players of Canada
Ontario Hockey Association Senior A League (1890–1979) players
People from Algoma District
Undrafted National Hockey League players